Collins Injera (born 18 October 1986) is a former Kenyan rugby player. He holds the second place for number of tries scored on the World Rugby Sevens Series with 271. He is known for his achievements with Kenyan national rugby sevens team.

Career 
Injera started playing rugby while at Vihiga High School in Vihiga. After graduation in 2005 he joined military team Ulinzi RFC playing in the Kenya Cup league. The team was later disbanded, and he moved to Mwamba RFC, a Nairobi-based team where he plays as a wing.

Now a strong player for the Kenyan Sevens squad, Injera debuted with the team at the 2006 Dubai Sevens and played in the 2009 Rugby World Cup Sevens, where Kenya reached the semifinals. He became the top try scorer for 2008–09 IRB Sevens World Series season with 42 tries. He also scored 210 points and finished second behind Ben Gollings of England in the individual points table.

Injera has also played for the Kenya national rugby union team (15s) at his usual position left wing (number 11), playing at the 2011 World Cup Qualifiers.

In February 2013, Injera was dropped from the Kenya national sevens team and his contract was cancelled by the head coach Mike Friday. This was because of a conflict between Injera's club Mwamba RFC and the Kenya national sevens team. This conflict led to Injera missing training sessions with the Kenya national sevens team and therefore breaching his contract. As a consequence of this breach, Injera's contract was cancelled.

In 2022, He was recalled into the Kenyan squad for the Rugby World Cup Sevens in Cape Town. He announced his retirement from rugby in January 2023.

Awards
Injera was nominated for the 2008–09 IRB Sevens Player of the Year award, which was eventually won by Ollie Phillips (rugby union) Injera won the Kenyan Sportsman of the Year award in 2009.
In 2010, Injera was awarded the presidential Order of Golden Warriors (OGW) alongside his brother Humphrey Kayange for their performance in the 2008–09 IRB Sevens World Series. Collins Injera was named Player of the final in 2016 Singapore Sevens, after helped Kenya to win their first tournament in World Sevens Series.

Personal life
Injera's older brother Humphrey Kayange is a former captain of the Kenyan sevens squad. Their younger brother Michael Agevi has also played rugby for the Sevens team in the past.

Injera has a degree in mass communication from Kenya College for Communication Technology (KCCT). He is an alumnus of Daystar University.

References

External links 
 
 

Kenyan rugby union players
Rugby union wings
1986 births
Living people
Sportspeople from Nairobi
Male rugby sevens players
Rugby sevens players at the 2016 Summer Olympics
Olympic rugby sevens players of Kenya
Kenya international rugby sevens players
Daystar University alumni
Rugby sevens players at the 2020 Summer Olympics